The Suriname International Badminton Tournament is a Pan American Circuit badminton event first held inaugural in 1998 at the Anthony Nesty Indoor Stadium in Paramaribo, Suriname.
The Suriname International Badminton Tournament is now held annually in Paramaribo since 2008, and is hosted by the Surinamese Badminton Association (SBB) also sanctioned by the Badminton World Federation (BWF) and the Badminton Pan America (Badminton Pan Am)

Past winners 
Below is the list of all the past winners.

Finals

2019 Ring Sport Center, Paramaribo

2018 Ring Sport Center, Paramaribo

2017 Ismay van Wilgen Sporthal, Paramaribo

2016 Ismay van Wilgen Sporthal, Paramaribo

2015 Ismay van Wilgen Sporthal, Paramaribo

2014 Ismay van Wilgen Sporthal, Paramaribo

2013 Ismay van Wilgen Sporthal, Paramaribo

2012 Ismay van Wilgen Sporthal, Paramaribo

2011 Anthony Nesty Indoor Stadium, Paramaribo

2010 Anthony Nesty Indoor Stadium, Paramaribo

2009 Anthony Nesty Indoor Stadium, Paramaribo

2008 Anthony Nesty Indoor Stadium, Paramaribo

1998 Anthony Nesty Indoor Stadium, Paramaribo

Successful players
Below is the list of the most ever successful players in the Suriname International Badminton Tournament with more than one title:

Performances by nation

Sources 
http://www.tournamentsoftware.com/sport/tournament.aspx?id=6DE19E1D-F01C-4B91-9C09-EC31AEA41B1F
http://www.tournamentsoftware.com/sport/tournament.aspx?id=CF9DD146-DA29-4918-8DC5-CD26FB8D32F3
http://www.tournamentsoftware.com/sport/tournament.aspx?id=F206A81D-8FE8-4F0F-AB7F-115BA77E2AD9
http://www.tournamentsoftware.com/sport/tournament.aspx?id=1202F93A-C2E7-4B85-AD17-1DF6577A258B
http://www.badminton.sr/contact.html

International sports competitions hosted by Suriname
Badminton tournaments in Suriname
Badminton tournaments
Badminton in Suriname